Buxheim is a municipality in the district of Unterallgäu in Bavaria, Germany.

Transportation

Buxheim is served by the Leutkirch-Memmingen railway.

References

Unterallgäu